Donaldo Arza (born 15 August 1946) is a Panamanian middle-distance runner. He competed in the men's 800 metres at the 1972 Summer Olympics. Arza finished fourth in the 1500 metres at the 1971 Pan American Games.

References

External links
 

1946 births
Living people
Athletes (track and field) at the 1972 Summer Olympics
Panamanian male middle-distance runners
Olympic athletes of Panama
Athletes (track and field) at the 1971 Pan American Games
Pan American Games competitors for Panama
Competitors at the 1970 Central American and Caribbean Games
Central American and Caribbean Games silver medalists for Panama
Central American and Caribbean Games bronze medalists for Panama
Place of birth missing (living people)
Universiade medalists for Panama
Universiade medalists in athletics (track and field)
Central American and Caribbean Games medalists in athletics
Medalists at the 1970 Summer Universiade